León Orlandianyi (born 11 November 2001 in Vienna) is an Austrian actor.

Life 
León Orlandianyi was born in Vienna and spent his childhood with his mother in New York, Panama, Mexico and Vienna. He speaks fluent English, German and Spanish. He graduated school with an International Baccalaureate in 2020 and completed his military service at the Austrian Armed Forces as part of the Gardebataillon in 2022.

Acting
After initial acting experiences in a graduate film at the SAE Institute and Bibi Salehi’s short film Dinnertime, he obtained an episode leading role in 2015 in the Austrian television series Soko Donau. Various roles followed this in television productions, such as Die Kinder der Villa Emma, Die Stille danach, Soko Kitzbühel and Meiberger - Der Alpenkrimi, followed in 2019 by his first leading role in the German family horror film The Scary House (German: Das Schaurige Haus), also known as The Strange House. In 2020, he was cast once again in Soko Donau under director Olaf Kreinsen.

He was nominated in the 2021 Romy Awards in the Most Popular Emerging Male Actor category.

On the St. Gilgen International School stage, he held a TED Talk in 2020 intending to motivate people to leave their comfort zone and draw strength from discomfort.

Critique Erik Piepenburg stated in The New York Times that 'Orlandianyi is especially good as the protective big brother' in the context of his main role in the movie The Strange House.

Personal 
Orlandianyi practices many different sports (including Krav Maga, surfing, urban exploration, calisthenics, acrobatics, and skiing) and is also an avid chess player. Together with his team, he has taken first place in the Vienna School Age Chess Championship twice as well as once in the Chess Provincial Championship.

Filmography 

 2013: Dinnertime
 2014: Die Ankunft
 2015: Soko Donau
 2016: Die Kinder der Villa Emma
 2016: Die Stille danach
 2018: Soko Kitzbühel
 2018: Meiberger – Der Alpenkrimi
 2019: The Scary House
 2021: SOKO Donau – "Gastfreundschaft"
 2021: Am Ende – Die Macht der Kränkung

Awards and nominations 

 2021: Romyverleihung 2021 - nominated for the Romy Award as Most Popular Emerging Male Actor

References

External links 
 
 León Orlandianyi at crew united
 León Orlandianyi at castupload.com
 León Orlandianyi agency profile
 TEDxStGilgenInternationalSchool
 ROMY 2021: León Orlandianyi
 Kurier.at
 Ari Rath: "Ich frage mich, wo der ‚Chef‘ bleibt"
 Trailer "Das schaurige Haus"

Austrian actors
2001 births
Living people